Arthur Jeremiah Roberts (October 11, 1867 – 1929) was the 14th President of Colby College, Maine, United States from 1908–1927, notable for being the first non-preacher president of the school. He guided the college through its first centennial celebration and World War I.

Early life
Roberts was born in Waterboro, Maine, to Albert and Evelyn Roberts. He was educated at Alfred High School in Alfred, Maine, and Limerick Academy in Limerick, Maine, before attending Colby College in the fall of 1886 along with a class of 32 other students.

Career
Upon graduating in 1890, Colby College elected him the assistant professor of rhetoric.  In 1894 he was promoted to professor of English. In 1895, he married Ms. Ada Louise Peabody. In 1900, he studied one year at Harvard University and received a master's degree.

Presidency
In 1908, he was promoted to president. During his presidency, two new dormitories were constructed, in 1912 and 1915. He led the Centennial Fund, which by 1920 had raised $450,000 in pledges and an additional $125,000 from the General Education Board, for which Roberts had specially applied. His term also saw the creation and dissolution of the Students Army Training Corps at Colby in conjunction with World War I. While at Colby, he was elected as a director of the Maine Central Railroad Company. He was known alternatively as "Old Rob" and "Prexy Roberts".

Published works
Footprints, Published by Colby College in 1928

References

1870 births
1956 deaths
Colby College alumni
Columbia University faculty
Colby College faculty
Presidents of Colby College
Harvard University alumni
People from Waterboro, Maine